The Subcommittee on Legislative and Budget Process is a subcommittee within the House Rules Committee

According to the Committee rules, this Subcommittee has general responsibility for measures or matters related to relations between the Congress and the Executive Branch.

Members, 117th Congress 

Source:

Members, 116th Congress

Members, 115th Congress

External links
Rules Committee, Subcommittee page

Rules Legislative and Budget Process